Euclid Kiriakovich Kyurdzidis,  Euclid Gurdjiev (Gr. Ευκλείδης Κιουρτζίδης του Κυριάκου, born 22 February 1968 in Yessentuki) is a Russian actor, best known for his role as Ruslan Shamayev in Voyna. He was born to ethnic Greek parents in Yessentuki, Stavropol Krai. He has two brothers and an older sister.

References

External links
 Official Site
 

1968 births
Living people
Russian male film actors
Pontic Greeks
Russian people of Greek descent
People from Yessentuki
Russian male stage actors
21st-century Russian male actors
Honored Artists of the Russian Federation
Gerasimov Institute of Cinematography alumni